Omar Ayub Khan (born 26 January 1970) is a Pakistani politician. He was the last Federal Minister for Economic Affairs under the Prime Ministership of Imran Khan from April 2021 until April 2022. He previously served as Federal Minister for Energy from 11 September 2018 to 16 April 2021. He had been a member of the National Assembly of Pakistan from August 2018 till January 2023. He is the grandson of the former President of Pakistan, Field Marshal Ayub Khan. Previously, he served as a member of the National Assembly from 2002 to 2007 and again from 2014 to 2015. He also served as the Minister of State for Finance in the federal cabinet from 2004 to 2007.

Early life and education
He was born on 28 
January  1970 to Gohar Ayub Khan in District Haripur. He received his degrees from the George Washington University in 1993 and 1996, respectively.

Political career
He was elected to the National Assembly of Pakistan from Constituency NA-19 (Haripur) as a candidate of Pakistan Muslim League (Q) (PML-Q) in 2002 Pakistani general election. He received 81,496 votes and defeated Pir Sabir Shah.

He ran for the seat of the National Assembly from Constituency NA-19 (Haripur) as a candidate of PML (Q) in 2008 Pakistani general election, but was unsuccessful. He received 50,631 votes and lost the seat to Sardar Muhammad Mushtaq Khan.

He joined Pakistan Muslim League (N) (PML-N) in 2012.

He ran for the seat of the National Assembly from Constituency NA-19 (Haripur) as a candidate of PML (N) in 2013 Pakistani general election, but was unsuccessful. He received 116,308 votes and lost the seat to Raja Aamer Zaman.

He was re-elected to the National Assembly from Constituency NA-19 (Haripur) as a candidate of PML (N) in the by-election held in 2014  and also served as Chairman Standing Committee on Finance, Revenue and Economic Affairs. In 2015, he was unseated as he became ineligible to continue in office as constituency election was invalidated by voting irregularities due to rigging.

In February 2018, he joined Pakistan Tehreek-e-Insaf (PTI).

He was re-elected to the National Assembly from Constituency NA-17 (Haripur) as a candidate of PTI in 2018 Pakistani general election. He received 172,609 votes and defeated Babar Nawaz Khan.

On 11 September 2018, he was inducted into the federal cabinet of Prime Minister Imran Khan and was appointed Federal Minister for Power.

On 24 April 2019 after the PM reshuffled the cabinet team, he was given the additional charge of the Ministry of Petroleum, which was previously held by Ghulam Sarwar Khan.

In mid April 2021 Prime Minister Imran Khan reshuffled the Cabinet again transferring Omar Ayub Khan from Minister of Energy to Minister of Economic Affairs.

Writings
In 2008 he penned a report entitled Roles and responsibilities of MNAs for the Islamabad-based pro-democracy think tank Pildat.

References

Living people
1970 births
Pakistani MNAs 2002–2007
Pakistani MNAs 2013–2018
Pakistani MNAs 2018–2023
Pakistan Muslim League (Q) MNAs
Pakistan Muslim League (N) MNAs
Pakistan Tehreek-e-Insaf MNAs
Omar
George Washington University School of Business alumni
People from Haripur District
Army Burn Hall College alumni